Sporochnacaeae is the only family in the order Sporochnales in the brown algae (class Phaeophyceae). Member of this family are thread-like algae growing by means of an intercalary row of dome shaped cells  at the base of the hairs.

References

External links
 AlgaeBase

 
Brown algae families